Van Zandt is an unincorporated community in Whatcom County, in the U.S. state of Washington.

History
A post office called Van Zandt was established in 1892, and remained in operation until 1955. J. M. Van Zandt, an early postmaster, gave the community his name.

References

Unincorporated communities in Whatcom County, Washington
Unincorporated communities in Washington (state)